Raid on Cartagena may refer to:

 Raid on Cartagena (1683)
 Raid on Cartagena (1697)